Total

Total

Total

Total

Anatoly Grigor'evich Pisarenko (born January 10, 1958) is a former Olympic weightlifter for the USSR. He was born in Kyiv, where he trained at Dynamo.

After Pisarenko was caught with Aleksandr Kurlovich in possession of steroids by the Canadian customs in 1985, he was given a lifetime ban by the Soviet Weightlifting Federation.

Major results

 This tournament was counted as European Weightlifting Championships of the corresponding year.

World records by Anatoly Pisarenko 
He set thirteen World records in career.

References 

1958 births
Living people
Soviet male weightlifters
Olympic weightlifters of the Soviet Union
Anatoly Pisarenko
Ukrainian male weightlifters
Sportspeople from Kyiv
Doping cases in weightlifting
European Weightlifting Championships medalists
World Weightlifting Championships medalists
Fourth convocation members of the Verkhovna Rada
Ukrainian sportsperson-politicians